The Romanian Sport Horse or Romanian Saddle Horse, is a Romanian breed of light riding horse. It was bred from 1962 from a variety of other breeds including Arab, Furioso-North Star, Gidran, Romanian Trotter and Thoroughbred. It is used as a carriage horse, for riding, for showing and as a sport horse. It is well-suited to show-jumping.

References 

Horse breeds
Horse breeds originating in Romania